The Partita in D minor for solo violin (BWV 1004) by Johann Sebastian Bach was written between 1717 and 1720. It is a part of his compositional cycle called Sonatas and Partitas for Solo Violin.

Structure 

Except for the ciaccona, the movements are dance types of the time, and they are frequently listed by their French names: Allemande, Courante, Sarabande, Gigue, and Chaconne. The final movement is written in the form of variations, and lasts approximately as long as the first four movements combined.

Performance time of the whole partita varies between 26 and 32 minutes, depending on the approach and style of the performer.

Reception 

Professor Helga Thoene suggests that this partita, and especially its last movement, was a tombeau written in memory of Bach's first wife, Maria Barbara Bach (who died in 1720), though this theory is controversial.

Yehudi Menuhin called the Chaconne "the greatest structure for solo violin that exists".

Violinist Joshua Bell has said the Chaconne is "not just one of the greatest pieces of music ever written, but one of the greatest achievements of any man in history. It's a spiritually powerful piece, emotionally powerful, structurally perfect." He played the piece busking in L'Enfant Plaza for The Washington Post.

Johannes Brahms in a letter to Clara Schumann described the piece, "On one stave, for a small instrument, the man [Bach] writes a whole world of the deepest thoughts and most powerful feelings. If I imagined that I could have created, even conceived the piece, I am quite certain that the excess of excitement and earth-shattering experience would have driven me out of my mind."

Transcriptions of the Ciaccona 
Raymond Erickson has identified approximately two hundred transcriptions and arrangements of Bach's Ciaccona.

Piano transcriptions 
Since Bach's time, several transcriptions of the piece have been made for other instruments, particularly for the piano (including those by Ferruccio Busoni, Alexander Siloti, Joachim Raff, and Rudolf Lutz), and for the piano left-hand (by Johannes Brahms, Paul Wittgenstein, and Géza Zichy).

Felix Mendelssohn and Robert Schumann each wrote piano accompaniments for the work.

Carl Reinecke transcribed the piece for piano duet.

Organ transcriptions 
The earliest version for organ is by William Thomas Best. Further transcriptions are by John Cook, Wilhelm Middelschulte, Walter Henry Goss-Custard (1915–55), and Henri Messerer (1838–1923).

In the preface to his 1955 transcription, John Cook writes: "The Chaconne is sublimely satisfying in its original form, yet many will agree that a single violin is only able to hint at the vast implications of much of this music … It is perhaps not unreasonable to suppose that Bach would have chosen the organ, had he transcribed the Chaconne himself, as the instrument best suited to the scale of his ideas … A good performance on the violin may be taken as the best guide to interpretation on the organ – the two instruments are not without their points in common, and both were beloved of Bach."

Cello transcriptions 
There is a transcription of the Chaconne for solo cello made by cellist Johann Sebastian Paetsch in 2015. This has been published by the Hofmeister Musikverlag in Leipzig.

Guitar transcriptions 
The Chaconne is often performed on guitar. Marc Pincherle, Secretary of the French Society of Musicology in Paris, wrote in 1930: "If, insofar as certain rapid monodic passages are concerned, opinion is divided between the violin and the guitar as the better medium, the guitar always triumphs in polyphonic passages; that is to say almost throughout the entire work. The timbre of the guitar creates new and emotional resonance and unsuspected dynamic gradations in those passages which might have been created purely for the violin; as for instance the variations in arpeggi."

The most well-known transcription for guitar is the Segovia transcription. Many guitarists today prefer to play the Chaconne directly from the violin score.

Orchestra transcriptions 
There are a number of transcriptions of the Chaconne for orchestras of different sizes, including Leopold Stokowski's transcription for a full symphony orchestra.

Other transcriptions 
Gustav Leonhardt arranged the Partita for harpsichord solo. Anne Dudley arranged Bach's Chaconne for piano trio, and a recording by the Eroica Trio appears on their Baroque album. The Chaconne has also been arranged for harpsichord by Pieter-Jan Belder and for violin plus four voices by Christoph Poppen and the Hilliard Ensemble. The Chaconne has been arranged for pedal harp by Skaila Kanga.

Literature 
In 2005 Joseph C. Mastroianni published Chaconne The Novel. Milo, abandoned by the father who introduced him to Chaconne, studied in Spain for four years to master the piece.

In 2008 Arnold Steinhardt, the violin soloist and first violinist of the Guarneri String Quartet, published Violin Dreams, a memoir about his life as a violinist and about his ultimate challenge: playing Bach's Chaconne.

In 2017  and  published a book about Bach's Chaconne: Excerpts from Eternity – The Purification of Time and Character, the Fulfilment of Love and Cooperation with the Celestial Will in Johann Sebastian Bach's Ciaccona for Violin.

Notes and references 
Notes

References

Sources

Further reading
 Erickson, Raymond. 2003. "Toward a 21st-Century Interpretation of Bach's Ciaccona for Solo Violin, BWV 1004/5". The American Bach Society Newsletter, Spring, 2003.
 Erickson, Raymond. 2019. "Popularisation and transformation:  Bach's Ciaccona for Unaccompanied Violin, BWV 1004/5, in the Nineteenth Century." Bach and Chopin:  Baroque Traditions in the Music of the Romantics, ed. Szymon Paczkowski, 371–395.  Warsaw: The Fryderyk Chopin Institute, 2019.
 Erickson, Raymond. 2020. "Bach's Violin Ciaccona in America". EMAg:  The Magazine of Early Music America 26/3 (September 2020), 46–52.

External links 

"On Bach's Second Violin Partita" by Dmitri N. Smirnov, 30 May 2018, Wikilivres.ru
Bach's Chaconne in D minor for solo violin: An application through analysis by Larry Solomon
, arranged by W. T. Best, played by D'Arcy Trinkwon
, Nathan Milstein
Recording of Busoni's transcription of the Chaconne by Boris Giltburg in MP3 format (archived on the Wayback Machine)
Partita No. 2 (complete), played on electric bass by Dave Grossman (audio and video)
Podcast, Arnold Steinhardt discusses his lifelong quest to master the chaconne
Partita No. 2, performed on guitar by Yaron Hasson (from the Wayback Machine)

German article on Bachs Chaconne

Suites by Johann Sebastian Bach
Bach2
1720 compositions
Compositions in D minor